The 1911 Iowa Hawkeyes football team represented the University of Iowa in the 1911 college football season. Led by second-year head coach Jesse Hawley, the Hawkeyes compiled an overall record of 3–4 with a mark of 2–2 in conference play, tying for fourth place in the Western Conference. The team played home games at Iowa Field in Iowa City, Iowa.

Schedule

References

Iowa
Iowa Hawkeyes football seasons
Iowa Hawkeyes football